Guentheria may be:
 Guentheria , a synonym for Gaillardia, a genus of flowering plants in the family Asteraceae
 Guentheria , synonym for Corsinia, a genus of liverworts in the order Marchantiales
 Guentheria , synonym for Halichoeres, a genus of fish

See also 
 Guenthera (disambiguation), several genera